Jorn Vermeulen (born 16 April 1987 in Torhout) is a Belgian football player who played for the national youth teams, played for 10 seasons for teams at the highest two levels of the Belgian football league system, and has semi-retired, currently playing for Nieuwpoort in the amateur Belgian Provincial Leagues.

Career
Vermeulen, a defender, began his youth career in 1993 with Club Brugge. During his junior career, Vermeulen played, in progressive years, for each of the Belgium national youth teams: Belgium U16, Belgium U17, Belgium U18, Belgium U19, Belgium U20 and Belgium U21.

Vermeulen was promoted to Club Brugge's Jupiler League team, at the top of the Belgian football league system, for the 2006–07 season.

Honours
Club Brugge
Belgian Cup: 2006–07

References

External links

1987 births
Living people
Belgian footballers
Club Brugge KV players
Oud-Heverlee Leuven players
Royal Antwerp F.C. players
S.K. Beveren players
K.M.S.K. Deinze players
Association football defenders
Belgian Pro League players
Challenger Pro League players
People from Torhout
Footballers from West Flanders